Coomassie may refer to:

Coomassie brilliant blue, a dye
Coomassie, an historical name for Kumasi, Ghana, and namesake of the dye

See also
Ibrahim Coomassie, Nigerian police officer
Abidina Coomassie, Nigerian journalist